Hampshire 1 is an English level 10 Rugby Union league for teams based in Hampshire and the Isle of Wight.  Up until the 2017–18 season it was known as Hampshire 2 but was changed to Hampshire 1 following the restructuring of the Hampshire leagues, which would see the re-introduction of a third division as well as 2nd and 3rd XV sides joining for the first time.  Each year some of the clubs in this division also take part in the RFU Junior Vase - a level 9-12 national competition.

The ten teams play home and away matches from September through to April.  Promoted teams move up to Hampshire Premier while relegated teams drop to Hampshire 2.

The points system is as follows.

4 points awarded for a win.
2 points awarded for a draw.
0 points awarded for a loss.
1 "bonus" (+) point awarded for scoring 4 tries (or more).
1 "bonus" (+) point awarded for losing by 7 points (or fewer).

No team can get more than 5 points in a match. Points awarded are the same regardless of the outcome at home or away.

Teams for 2021-22

Lockheath Pumas RFC finished 4th in 2019-20, but were promoted to Hampshire Premier for the current season, their place was taken by  US Portsmouth who had withdrawn from London 3 South West in season 2019-20. 

Farnborough who, were relegated from Hampshire Premier (12th) in 2019-20, fulfilled their early fixtures but subsequently withdrew from the league in November 2021.

The teams competing in 2021-22 achieved their places in the league based on performances in 2019-20, the 'previous season' column in the table below refers to that season not 2020-21.

Season 2020–21

On 30th October the RFU announced  that a decision had been taken to cancel Adult Competitive Leagues (National League 1 and below) for the 2020/21 season meaning Hampshire 1 was not contested.

Teams for 2019-20

Teams for 2018-19

Participating Clubs 2017-18

Participating Clubs 2016-17
Aldershot & Fleet
Alresford
Alton 
Fawley
Kingsclere
Loxheath Pumas (relegated from Hampshire 1)
Lymington Mariners
Nomads
Overton
Southampton

Participating Clubs 2015-2016
Aldershot & Fleet
Alresford
Alton (relegated from Hampshire 1)
Fawley
Kingsclere
Nomads
Overton
Romsey (relegated from Hampshire 1)
Southampton
Ventnor

Participating Clubs 2014-2015
Aldershot & Fleet
Alresford
Chineham
Fawley
Locksheath Pumas
Kingsclere
Overton (relegated from Hampshire 1)
Southampton (relegated from Hampshire 1)
Southsea Nomads
Ventnor

Participating Clubs 2013-14

Petersfield and Fareham Heathens promoted into Hampshire 1 at the end of the season.

Participating Clubs 2012-13
Alresford
Chineham
Fareham Heathens
Fawley	
Locksheath Pumas
Lymington Mariners
Nomads (relegated from Hampshire 1)
Overton
Solent University
Stoneham
Ventnor (relegated from Hampshire 1)

Original teams

When league rugby began in 1987 this division (known as Hampshire 2) contained the following teams:

Andover
Ellingham & Ringwood
Fordingbridge
Guernsey
Nomads
Overton
Pegasus Palmerians
Romsey
Ventnor
Waterlooville

Hampshire 1 honours

Hampshire 2 (1987–1993)

Originally known as Hampshire 2, it was tier 9 league with promotion up to Hampshire 1 and as it was the lowest league level in the region, there was no relegation.

Hampshire 2 (1993–1996)

The creation of National 5 South meant that Hampshire 2 dropped from a tier 9 league to a tier 10 league for the years that National 5 South was active.  Promotion continued to Hampshire 1, while the introduction of Hampshire 3 ahead of the 1994–95 season meant that there was now relegation.

Hampshire 2 (1996–2000)

The cancellation of National 5 South at the end of the 1995–96 season meant that Hampshire 2 reverted to being a tier 9 league.  Promotion and relegation continued to Hampshire 1 and Hampshire 3 respectively.

Hampshire 2 (2000–2009)

The introduction of London 4 South West ahead of the 2000–01 season meant Hampshire 2 dropped to become a tier 10 league.  Promotion and relegation continued to Hampshire 1 and Hampshire 3 respectively.

Hampshire 2 (2009–2018)

Hampshire 2 remained a tier 10 league despite national restructuring by the RFU.  Promotion was to Hampshire 1 and there was no relegation due to the cancellation of Hampshire 3 at the end of the 2008–09 season.

Hampshire 1 (2018–present)

Restructuring of the Hampshire leagues saw Hampshire 2 renamed as Hampshire 1.  It remained a tier 10 league with promotion to Hampshire Premier (formerly Hampshire 1) and relegation returned to the newly introduced Hampshire 2 (formerly Hampshire 3).

Number of league titles

Isle Of Wight (3)
Aldershot & Fleet (2)
Alresford (2)
Farnborough (2)
New Milton & District (2)
Petersfield (2)
Romsey (2)
Ventnor (2)
Alton (1)
Andover (1)
Chichester II (1)
East Dorset (1)
Eastleigh (1)
Esso (1)
Fareham Heathens (1)
Fordingbridge (1)
Locksheath Pumas (1)
Nomads (1)
Overton (1)
Sandown & Shanklin (1)
Southampton (1)
Team Solent (1)
Tottonians (1)
Trojans (1)

See also
London & SE Division RFU
Hampshire RFU
English rugby union system
Rugby union in England

Notes

References

10
Rugby union in Hampshire